Cheraul (Sörawıl) is a rural locality (a selo) in Pevomaysky Selsoviet, Yanaulsky District, Bashkortostan, Russia. The population was 121 as of 2010. There are 4 streets.

Geography 
Cheraul is located 23 km south of Yanaul (the district's administrative centre) by road. Zaytsevo is the nearest rural locality.

References 

Rural localities in Yanaulsky District